A soul patch, also known as a mouche, is a single small patch of facial hair just below the lower lip and above the chin.

Soul patches came to prominence in the 1950s and 1960s, as a style of facial hair common among African-American men, most notably Jazz musicians. It became popular with beatniks, artists, and those who frequented the jazz scene and moved in literary and artistic circles. Jazz flute players who disliked the feel of the flute mouthpiece on a freshly shaven lower lip could use a soul patch.  On the other hand, jazz trumpeters preferred the goatee for the comfort it provided when using a trumpet mouthpiece.

The soul patch saw reinvigorated recognition in the early 1990s when Luke Perry's Buffy the Vampire Slayer character Oliver Pike wore a soul patch. The soul patch was also briefly referenced in the 1992 book Garden State. Multiple prominent athletes also started donning soul patches, such as Mike Piazza and Apolo Ohno. The facial hairstyle also rose to prominence in the mall goth and nu-metal scenes around the late 1990s to early 2000s.

See also
 List of facial hairstyles

References

External links

Beard